Elyse Marie Levesque (born September 10, 1985) is a Canadian actress. She is known for playing Chloe Armstrong in the Syfy original series Stargate Universe and the witch Genevieve in The Originals.

Early life 
Levesque was born and raised in Regina, Saskatchewan, Canada.

Career 
Elyse Levesque began acting at age 11, when she became part of a repertory company of young actors for the acclaimed children's television series The Incredible Story Studio. In addition, she did commercial work, and went on to do a two-year stint playing the villainous Maxine Rich on the futuristic children's series 2030 CE.

Following high school, Levesque travelled around the world for two years as a model working in Taiwan, Japan, Italy, Spain, and France before returning to Canada to study fine arts. In 2006, Levesque moved to Vancouver, British Columbia to focus on a full-time acting career. She immediately enrolled in acting classes, and began to land parts in a number of television and film projects. She has taken on diverse roles ranging from Virginia (Cissy) Poe, the ailing wife of Edgar Allan Poe, in the Masters of Horror episode "The Black Cat", to a flame-wielding bog witch in Flash Gordon. She has also made guest appearances in Smallville, Men in Trees, and a variety of other TV shows for both Canadian and American media markets.

She portrayed Chloe Armstrong, the daughter of a U.S. Senator in the Syfy original series, Stargate Universe. In 2014, she played the role of the witch Genevieve in the first season of The Vampire Diaries-spin-off The Originals.

Filmography

Film

Television

References

External links 

Elyse Levesque on Twitter

1985 births
Living people
20th-century Canadian actresses
21st-century Canadian actresses
Actresses from Regina, Saskatchewan
Canadian child actresses
Canadian film actresses
Canadian television actresses
Fransaskois people